The Sărățel is a left tributary of the river Buzău in Romania. It discharges into the Buzău in Berca.

References

Rivers of Romania
Rivers of Buzău County